Tue or TUE may refer to:

Science and technology
 Technische Universiteit Eindhoven, Eindhoven University of Technology, the Netherlands
 Therapeutic Use Exemption, of drugs in sport
 Tue iron or tuyere

People
 Tue Bjørn Thomsen (1972–2006), Danish boxer
 Tue Greenfort (born 1973), Danish artist
 Tue Hellstem (born 1961), Danish pentathlete, competed at the 1988 Olympics
 Tue Lassen, orienteer, competed at the 2013 World Games 
 Tue Madsen (born 1969), Danish musician
 Tue Trung (1230–1291), medieval Buddhist teacher
 Tue Huynh-Nhut Vo (born 1995), Vietnamese American lab tester and Pokémon Master
 Tue West (born 1977), Danish composer

Places
 Tue Brook, a stream in Liverpool, England
 Tue Brook House
 Tue Brook railway station
 Tue Marshes Light, a lighthouse in Virginia, US
 Tue, a barangay in the municipality of Tadian in Mountain Province, Philippines

Other uses
 Tuesday (short form)
 Tuyuca language (ISO 639 code: tue)

See also

 Tue Rechnung! Donnerwort, BWV 168, a Bach cantata
 To (disambiguation)
 Too (disambiguation)
 Two (disambiguation)